David Guy Parsons (born 1964) is a British rock musician who is best known as the original bassist for English grunge band Bush.

Life and career

Before joining the grunge band Bush, was a member of punk band The Partisans, and alternative rock band Transvision Vamp. Parsons met up in 1992 with lead singer and guitarist, Gavin Rossdale, guitarist Nigel Pulsford, and drummer Robin Goodridge to form Bush. He stayed with the band until their breakup in 2002. When Bush reformed in 2010, Parsons decided not to rejoin.

Personal life 
Parsons has been in a relationship with girlfriend Sarah Chope since 1994.

Discography

With The Partisans

Time Was Right (1984)

With Transvision Vamp

Pop Art (1988)
Velveteen (1989)
Little Magnets Versus the Bubble of Babble (1991)

With Bush

Sixteen Stone (1994)
Razorblade Suitcase (1996)
Deconstructed (1997)
The Science of Things (1999)
Golden State (2001)

References

External links
 Bush fan site

Bush (British band) members
English rock bass guitarists
Male bass guitarists
Living people
People from Hillingdon
1964 births